Hungarian Templeton Program is a unique pilot program taking place between 15 September 2015 and 28 February 2017. The main purpose of the program is to develop and support exceptional Hungarian cognitive talents in the 10–29 age group.

John Templeton Foundation
Sir John Templeton (1912-2008) was strongly committed to supporting research in science, theology, philosophy and the social sciences. One of the main goals of his endeavors was to contribute to understanding the fundamental underlying principles of the universe and to building a better society on the ethical, intellectual and spiritual levels. 
He founded the John Templeton Foundation in 1987, which also includes the Templeton World Charity Foundation. The TWCF chooses which initiatives it funds and does not accept unsolicited proposals. In accordance with the testamentary provisions of Sir John Templeton , it supports worthy programs which seek answers to the "big questions" and challenges of life and the universe. As well, it provides assistance to persons with exceptional cognitive talent who contribute to the flourishing of humanity.

Hungarian Templeton Program
This program is implemented with the funding and the support of the Templeton World Charity Foundation and of the European Social Fund as co-sponsor. The program's advisory partner is the Association of Hungarian Talent Support Organizations (Magyar Tehetségsegítő Szervezetek Szövetsége - MATEHETSZ).
Launched on September 15, 2015 and lasting until February 28, 2017, the Hungarian Templeton Program is a unique pilot program whose main objective is to develop and support exceptional Hungarian cognitive talents in the 10-29 age group. Using a new methodology specifically designed for this purpose, program staff will identify 300 Hungarian youth with exceptional cognitive talents (Hungarian Junior Templeton Fellows) as well as 150 disadvantaged children aged 5–8 with exceptional cognitive talents.

The aim of the program is to bring together a creative community and network of exceptionally talented people whose members will, with the assistance of top-performing contemporary personalities, prepare themselves to take on the momentous task of becoming the leaders, thinkers and entrepreneurs of Hungary and Europe in the decades ahead.

A customized one-year talent support program will be developed for each of the selected talented youth (the Hungarian Junior Templeton Fellows). The program also devotes special attention to underprivileged children aged 5–8. It uses a unique talent testing procedure created for this age group, as well as a talent development program consisting of workshop sessions over a period of several days.

The program also offers assistance to talented youth identified during the selection process but not chosen as Hungarian Junior Templeton Fellows by offering them access to the ESF "Talents for Hungary" enrichment programs also supported by the Association of Hungarian Talent Support Organizations (MATEHETSZ).

Selection process
The 300 Hungarian Junior Templeton Fellows are to be selected using objective scientific criteria and a new methodology. Selection will involve tests measuring aptitudes in a number of areas.

For talented youth aged 10-19
IQ test, vocabulary, problem solving, working memory, motivation and creativity.

For talented youth aged 20-29
IQ test, evaluation of achievements and productivity based on a motivation letter, activities thus far, level of interest and an introductory presentation or video.

Program framework
Cognitive talents selected for the program – the Hungarian Junior Templeton Fellows – will each benefit from a one-year customized talent support package. Each young person will receive one-on-one mentoring from prominent Hungarian scientists and entrepreneurs who make up the program's roster of mentors. 
Elements of the support program include e-learning; coaching; personality development; networking; development of communication, linguistic, computer, research, innovation, financial and entrepreneurial skills; assistance in choosing a career path in a context of social responsibility.
 
In addition to supporting skill development in specific areas, the program places especial emphasis on encouraging Hungarian Junior Templeton Fellows to use their aptitudes and knowledge responsibly for the good of society.

Program content
Based on their individual needs and the options available in the program, Junior Fellows will receive a personalized talent support package which may include:

 Participation in scientific research and development projects 
 Familiarization with research centers, cases and practices in both scientific and business contexts
 Scholarships
 International travel (competitions, camps, conferences)
 Business trainings (e.g. Lean, Start-up)
 LinkedIn, Everyday Heroes and PREZI trainings
 Public speaking and presentation-making trainings
 Language learning opportunities 
 Familiarization with case studies in a business context
 Soft skill trainings 
 Activities to develop social responsibility
 Drafting business plans, support for start-ups 
 Support for social entrepreneurs (Ashoka) 
 Participation in national and international talent day events 
 Innovation camp

Post-program opportunities
This pilot program is for one year, and is expected to continue in Hungary and serve as a model for expansion into other countries in versions adapted to regional cultural differences. Talented youth selected for the program will be monitored and assisted for a few years after the end of the program by the ongoing network of contacts in the Hungarian Junior Templeton Fellow Network.

Mentoring
Substantive support for the Program is provided by our network of mentors: scientists, researchers, experts and businesspeople who have shown exceptional levels of achievement in their fields and careers. Mentoring is a crucial element of the program and a mentor will be assigned to every Hungarian Junior Templeton Fellow.

Supporters
 Gergely Bogányi, Hungarian pianist, recipient of the Kossuth Prize and the Franz Liszt Prize.

 Péter Csermely
Hungarian biochemist, specialized in network research, member of the Hungarian Academy of Sciences and of Academia Europaea. Professor at the Medical Institute of Chemical, Molecular Biology and Pathobiochemistry of Semmelweis University. Between 2008 and 2010, member of the Wise Persons' Committee of the President of the Republic of Hungary Dr. László Sólyom. One of the founders – and honorary president – of the Association of Hungarian Talent Support Organizations.

 Dr. Tamás Freund
Hungarian neurobiologist, laureate of the Széchenyi Prize, university professor, full member of the Hungarian Academy of Sciences, vice-president of the Academy's Department of Life Sciences since 2014. World renowned expert on the functioning of the cerebral cortex. Hungarian Talent Ambassador in 2011.

 Father Alfréd György
Member of the Camillian Order, Hungarian Talent Ambassador in 2011.

 Dr. László Lovász
Hungarian mathematician and university professor, recipient of the Széchenyi Prize, the Bolyai Grand Prize, as well as the János Bolyai and Wolf prizes, president of the Hungarian Academy of Sciences and full member of the National Academy of Sciences (US).

 Dr. Barna Mezey
Hungarian legal historian, Rector of Eötvös Loránd University, Chair of the University's Department of History of the Hungarian State and Law, Doctor of the Hungarian Academy of Sciences.

 Polgár Judit
The best woman chess player in the history of the game, international grandmaster, eight-time winner of the Chess Olympiad in the open category, two-time winner of the Women's Chess Olympiad, two-time silver medalist in the open category of the Olympiad, Hungarian superchampion, world youth champion among the boys' U14 and U12 age groups. Hungarian Talent Ambassador in 2014.

 Dr. László Sólyom
Hungarian jurist and professor, full member of the Hungarian Academy of Sciences. Member of the Constitutional Court of Hungary between 1989 and 1998, and Chief Justice from 1990 until 1998. President of Hungary between 2005 and 2010. Hungarian Talent Ambassador in 2011.

 Dr. Gábor Szabó 
Hungarian physicist, full member of the Hungarian Academy of Sciences, Rector of the University of Szeged.

 Dr. Ágoston Szél
Hungarian anatomist, Rector of Semmelweis University, university professor and institute director, Doctor of the Hungarian Academy of Sciences.

Further information
 Hungarian Templeton Program website
 Templeton World Charity Foundation website
 Association of Hungarian Talent Support Organizations (MATEHETSZ) website

John Templeton Foundation
Gifted education
Education in Hungary